Joseph Owino (born 6 April 1984) is a retired Ugandan football defender.

References

1984 births
Living people
Sportspeople from Kampala
Ugandan footballers
Uganda international footballers
SC Villa players
Uganda Revenue Authority SC players
Simba S.C. players
Azam F.C. players
Sofapaka F.C. players

Lipuli F.C. players
Association football defenders
Ugandan expatriate footballers
Expatriate footballers in Tanzania
Ugandan expatriate sportspeople in Tanzania
Expatriate footballers in Kenya
Ugandan expatriate sportspeople in Kenya
Tanzanian Premier League players